The Dutch Carnival Cake, also known as Carnival Cake (Dutch: Kermiskoek), is traditionally a Dutch delicacy that is similar to gingerbread cake. Its old recipe holds a variety of ingredients among which are freshly harvested rye flour and freshly harvested honey from the Betuwe region, additionally the cake is enriched with rock candy.

The Carnival Cake has a rich tradition, which sunk into oblivion over time. However, because the Carnival Cake was adopted in the list of the Centre for Folklife and Cultural Heritage - a country wide organization similar to UNESCO - the tradition can be maintained. Since this tradition was adopted, the original Dutch Carnival cake is procurable all year long.

History
Back in 1871 Jan ter Gouw already described the Carnival Cake in his book Folk Amusement (Volksvermaken). From this book the following song originated:

Historically, the Dutch Carnival Cake was made solely in October for the autumn carnival of Tiel. It used to be given as a wedding proposal present. A farmer’s son bought a Carnival Cake for his beloved. If the girl gave him a slice of the cake on the eighth or fourteenth day after the proposal, they would get engaged. If she did not serve the cake, she turned down his offer. Nowadays the offering of the lovecake is not a proposal anymore, but a token of love and appreciation between partners, family and friends.

There is still a Dutch bakery that produces the Carnival Cake, and so the tradition is being continued.

See also
 List of cakes

References

Dutch culture
Cakes